The Brazilian Presidential Helicopter is the Brazilian Air Force helicopter used to transport the President of Brazil. The current aircraft designation is VH-36 Caracal.

Two modified military versions of the Eurocopter Cougar, tail numbers 8737 and 8740, are currently used as the main presidential helicopters. The aircraft are configured to carry fifteen passengers plus three crew members.

See also
 Marine One
 Presidential State Car of the United States
 Presidential Helicopter of South Korea
 Presidential State Car of South Korea

References

Brazilian Air Force
Presidential aircraft
Brazilian helicopters
Vehicles of Brazil